Teals Crossroads is a populated place in Barbour County, Alabama. It is near the towns of Clio, Alabama and Blue Springs, Alabama.

References

Unincorporated communities in Alabama
Unincorporated communities in Barbour County, Alabama